Richard Allyn Enderle (November 6, 1947 – September 4, 2008) was an American guard  who played eight seasons in the National Football League. He attended the University of Minnesota.

Enderle was found dead at his home in Manhattan, New York on September 4, 2008.

References

1947 births
2008 deaths
People from Breckenridge, Minnesota
Players of American football from Minnesota
American football offensive guards
Minnesota Golden Gophers football players
Atlanta Falcons players
New York Giants players
San Francisco 49ers players
Green Bay Packers players